The Dickerson 41 is an American sailboat that was designed by Ernest Tucker as a cruiser and first built in 1973.

Production
The design was built by Dickerson Boatbuilders in Trappe, Maryland, United States. The company built the boats individually with custom interiors, between 1973 and 1983, completing 19 examples of the design.

Design
The Dickerson 41 is a recreational keelboat, built predominantly of hand-laid fiberglass, with marine-grade plywood bulkheads and teak wood trim. It has a masthead sloop or optional ketch rig, with epoxy-finished aluminum spars and a bowsprit. The design features a center cockpit, a concave raked stem, a raised counter transom, a keel-mounted rudder controlled by a wheel tiller and a fixed long keel, with a cutaway forefoot. It displaces  and carries  of internal keel ingot lead ballast.

The fuel tank holds .

The design has a number of optional cabin layouts. A typical arrangement includes  a double "V"-berth in the bow cabin, an "L"-shaped settee with a drop-down dinette table that makes a double berth and a straight settee in the main cabin. There is also an aft cabin with a double berth. The galley is located on the port side just forward of the center companionway ladder. The galley is "L"-shaped and is equipped with a three-burner alcohol-fired stove, a  capacity fiberglass icebox and a sink with a pressurized water supply. An optional navigation station is opposite the galley, on the starboard side. There are two heads, one amidships on the starboard side that includes a shower and a second optional one in the aft cabin.

Ventilation is provided by three opening ports and three deck hatches. There are also two fixed portlights.

The wood above decks is all teak, including the cockpit coaming, toe-rails, handrails and the hatches.

For sailing there are two speed genoa winches in the cockpit, plus genoa tracks. Three halyard winches are standard equipment. Both the mainsail and the mizzen sail have jiffy reefing. The bow incorporates an anchor locker. A teak deck was an option.

Operational history
A Dickerson 41 ketch built in 1974 completed a global circumnavigation between 1975 and 1979.

In a 1994 review Richard Sherwood wrote, "the 41 is the intermediate Dickerson. Dickerson also makes a 37 and a 50. All are based on Dickerson’s long experience with cruising ketches. The 41 has a number of rig options, such as a cutter or ketch rig, a self-tacking forestaysail, twin headsails, and a roller-furling genoa."

See also
List of sailing boat types

Related development
Dickerson 37

Similar sailboats
Baltic 40
Bayfield 40
Bristol 40
Bermuda 40
Caliber 40
Endeavour 40
Irwin 41
Irwin 41 Citation
Islander 40
Lord Nelson 41
Morgan Out Island 41
Newport 41
Nimbus 42
Nordic 40

References

External links
Video tour of a Dickerson 41

Keelboats
1970s sailboat type designs
Sailing yachts
Sailboat type designs by Ernest Tucker
Sailboat types built by Dickerson Boatbuilders